The 13th Cinema Express Awards were held on 14 June 1993, and honoured the best of South Indian films released in 1992. The awards were announced in March.

Tamil

Telugu

Malayalam

Solidaire excellency awards 
Awards in this field were given to film producer and director G. V. Iyer, playback singer P. Susheela, art director R. Krishnamurthy and the editing duo B. Lenin-V. T. Vijayan.

References 

1993 Indian film awards
Cinema Express Awards